"Finish What We Started" is a song written Michael Noble and Monty Powell, and recorded by American country music group Diamond Rio.  It was released in May 1995 as the fourth and final single from the album Love a Little Stronger.  The song reached #19 on the Billboard Hot Country Singles & Tracks chart.

Chart performance

References

1995 singles
1994 songs
Diamond Rio songs
Arista Nashville singles
Songs written by Monty Powell